Ms. Scrooge is a 1997 American made-for-television Christmas fantasy drama film starring Cicely Tyson and Katherine Helmond and is an adaptation of Charles Dickens's 1843 novella A Christmas Carol. The film changes the roles of Ebenezer Scrooge and Jacob Marley into female counterparts. The film is also notable for mentioning that Tiny Tim is dying of a "slow-growing congenital tumor", instead of an unnamed condition. The film's setting is changed from London to Providence, Rhode Island. It originally aired on USA Network on December 10, 1997.

Plot

In Providence, Rhode Island, the elderly and miserly Ebenita Scrooge has spent years climbing to the top and shutting everyone out of her life, especially on Christmas. She owns a savings and loan firm, and is ruthless when it comes to business; she underpays her employees and refuses to give them benefits such as a health plan, gives one patron trying to raise bail for her son a meager value for an antique lamp, and coldly evicts a family from one of the properties she owns for falling behind in the rent just days before Christmas. Moreover, she holds a distant relationship with her nephew and only immediate relative, Luke, who is the reverend of the local church.

On Christmas Eve evening, Ebenita returns home and encounters the ghost of Maude Marley, her late mentor, former partner, and the original owner of her firm. Maude warns Ebenita that she has been condemned to wander the Earthly plain for her shrewd selfishness and greed during her life, and that she has led Ebenita onto the same path. For both of their souls' sakes, Ebenita must learn from their mistakes and change her ways. Marley tells her that she will be visited by three ghosts who will try to show her where she has gone wrong in life and how she must effect the necessary changes to save their souls or suffer eternal punishment just like Maude. After Maude leaves, a spooked Ebenita goes to her firm and locks herself in her vault to keep the ghosts out.

The Ghost of Christmas Past appears at midnight, however, and takes Ebenita back to her past. As a bright young girl who was good with math even at a young age, Ebenita grew up in the Southern US in a happy household, with her father George, mother Clara, and younger brother Perry. Her father, an Army veteran, had aspired to open up a general store with a pair of his friends from the military, despite white opposition and lack of opportunities for African-Americans in those times. However, trouble ensued when George's partners backed out of the arrangement; one decided to move up north for better opportunities, and the other decided to start a laundromat instead. Determined to keep the building he planned to open the store at, he used the family savings and a few loans to pay the rent in advance, and used several cost-cutting measures to save money until he could find new partners. One night, however, the building was firebombed, and George was killed after rushing inside to try and put out the fire, which also consumed the building as the Scrooge family watched in horror. As the present-day Ebenita recounts, the loss of the store and her father's death left the family devastated, broke, and in debt, the latter of which they were only able to pay off by selling their family home. In adulthood, Ebenita moved to Providence shortly after her mother's death for better opportunities, while Perry married and followed in their father's footsteps by joining the military, and was shipped off to Vietnam. Ebenita soon met Maude and after impressing her, landed a job at what would eventually become her saving and loan firm. She also found love with Steven, a young lawyer also from the South and the two eventually planned to marry. However, things fell apart between them when Steven wanted to return to the South to help things improve for the black community there, but Ebenita, fearful of living broke and stuck as a beginner again, refused; this led to an argument which ended with their breakup. Even worse, not long afterwards, Perry died in Vietnam, leaving behind his wife and son Luke.

After waking up, Ebenita returns home where she encounters the Ghost of Christmas Present, who takes her to see what she doesn't know about the people in her life. She finds that her head employee Bob Cratchit and his family are happy in spite of their poverty and grateful to her despite of her miserliness. However, the family lives in worry as well, as Bob's son Tim is suffering from a slow-growing, congenital tumor that will eventually kill him, and the family doesn't have the money to pay for an operation that will save him (explaining why Bob asked Ebenita for a health plan previously). Ebenita asks why they haven't gone to public agencies for help, but the ghost reveals that they actually have tried to many times, but have been rejected again and again due to Bob's low salary. The ghost then takes Ebenita to show her that kindness on Christmas can come from anyone and anywhere, showing the family she evicted being put up in their children's school's gymnasium for the holiday. Finally, the ghost takes Ebenita to Luke's church to show him giving a sermon about the difference between heaven and hell, using a variation of the allegory of the long spoons.

After waking up again, Ebenita prepares for bed when she then encounters the silent Ghost of Christmas Yet to Come, who takes her to see what will become of her and everyone else should she not change her ways. In a possible future, Ebenita sees that without treatment, Tim has become critically ill and she has fired Bob for taking time off without notice to care for him. When Luke learns of this, he confronts Ebenita at her firm, trying to convince her to do the right thing to save Tim's life and her soul and berating her for her selfish and miserly ways, but to no avail. The two then get into a heated argument, which ends with Ebenita suffering a heart attack. Luke tends to her to calm her down, and then leaves at her request. Her employee Annie, after watching everything, offers to put the day's receipts away in the vault for her, but is harshly refused. While in the vault herself though, Ebenita's heart gives out again when she strains herself, and the present-day her watches as her future-self slowly succumbs to her heart attack, while Annie, hearing the commotion but too fearful for her job to go in the vault to check on her, departs, inadvertently leaving her boss to her fate. Ebenita then sees that following her death, her firm will be permanently shut down and, due to her having left no will, her entire fortune will be seized by the government for probate, back taxes, and legal fees. She also finds that her funeral will be sparsely attended by only Luke, his wife, and Bob, and will be short and uneventful. Finally, the ghost shows Ebenita Tim dying from his illness, surrounded by his family and Luke. Finally convinced to change her ways and determined to avert this terrible future, Ebenita begs the ghost for another chance and to tell her how to make things right.

Waking up for the last time in her own room on Christmas Day, with love and happiness in her heart, a gleeful Ebenita decides to make the most of her second chance. She decides to surprise Bob's family with a turkey dinner and pays the boy she had get it for her handsomely. She also returns the lamp she bought to its owner without charge and helps give food and warmth to the homeless. She then visits the Cratchit family and gives Bob both a raise and promotion to vice president of her firm, approves his request for a health plan, and gifts Tim with a puppy. Finally, she attends Luke's church for Christmas service, standing with her grandniece, much to his happiness.

Cast
Cicely Tyson as Ebenita Scrooge
Katherine Helmond as Maude Marley
Michael Beach as Rev. Luke
John Bourgeois as Cratchit
William Greenblatt as Tiny Tim Cratchit
Michael J. Reynolds as Ghost of Christmas Past
Shaun Austin-Olsen as Ghost of Christmas Present
Julian Richings as Ghost of Christmas Yet to Come

Production
The film was shot in Toronto.

See also
 List of Christmas films
 List of A Christmas Carol adaptations

References

External links

1997 television films
1997 films
1990s fantasy drama films
1990s Christmas drama films
American Christmas drama films
American fantasy drama films
Christmas television films
Films based on A Christmas Carol
Films set in Rhode Island
Films shot in Toronto
USA Network original films
Films directed by John Korty
Films scored by David Shire
American drama television films
1990s American films